Jack Rossiter (born 13 June 1997) is an Australian sports shooter. He competed in the men's 10 metre air rifle event at the 2016 Summer Olympics.

Rossiter represented Australia at the 2020 Summer Olympics in Tokyo, Japan. He competed in the men's 50 metre rifle three positions event. He did not score sufficient points to advance past qualification.

References

External links
 

1997 births
Living people
Australian male sport shooters
Olympic shooters of Australia
Shooters at the 2016 Summer Olympics
Place of birth missing (living people)
Shooters at the 2020 Summer Olympics
21st-century Australian people